Trajković (Cyrillic script: Трајковић) is a Serbian surname derived from a masculine given name Trajko.

Geographical distribution
As of 2014, 88.2% of all known bearers of the surname Trajković were residents of Serbia (frequency 1:360), 8.3% of Kosovo (1:1,002) and 2.4% of the Republic of Macedonia (1:3,905).

In Serbia, the frequency of the surname was higher than average (1:360) in the following districts:
 1. Pčinja District (1:40)
 2. Jablanica District (1:84)
 3. Nišava District (1:275)
 4. Podunavlje District (1:295)

People
Aleksandar Trajković (born 1981), football defender
Aleksandra Trajković (born 1975), pianist
Branislav Trajković (born 1989), footballer
Nikola Trajković (born 1981), football midfielder
Slobodan Trajković (born 1954), artist
Vlastimir Trajković (born 1947), composer and professor
Željko Trajković (born 1966), wrestler

References

Serbian surnames